Andrew Friedman may refer to:

 Andrew Friedman, American baseball executive and president/baseball operations of the Los Angeles Dodgers
 Andrew Friedman (actor), actor (It's Always Sunny in Philadelphia)
 Andy Friedman, American football player
 Drew "Dru-Ha" Friedman, Andrew Friedman

See also
Drew Friedman (disambiguation)
Andrew Freedman, owner of the New York Giants
Andrew Freeman (disambiguation)